OutNebraska is a Nebraska statewide LGBTQ advocacy, lobbying, and community organization.

History
A Lincoln LGBTQ community organization was incorporated as Outlinc in 2009. It expanded to a statewide organization and changed its name to OutNebraska in 2019.

Community events

Prairie Pride Film Festival

OutNebraska sponsors the Prairie Pride Film Festival, which has brought independent films on LGBTQ themes to Nebraska since 2010.

Let's Go Birding Together
OutNebraska hosts birdwatching events in warm weather months. Let's Go Birding Together ("LGBT") events are a partnership with Spring Creek Prairie Audubon Center.

Advocacy and organizing

OutNebraska opposed Nebraska's prohibition on same-sex marriage.

OutNebraska has advocated for a state law protecting LGBT people from employment and housing discrimination, expressing skepticism that city-level laws are comprehensive enough.

OutNebraska joined the ACLU in 2016 in providing training to help poll workers identify transgender and gender nonconforming Nebraska voters.

Partnerships

OutNebraska is affiliated with the Equality Federation and the Community Services Fund of Nebraska.

In expanding from Lincoln into a statewide organization, OutNebraska partnered with Panhandle Equality, an advocacy group in the Nebraska Panhandle.

See also

 LGBT rights in Nebraska
 PROMO
 One Iowa

References

External links
 OutNebraska website
 OutNebraska Twitter

Equality Federation